The slate-colored hawk (Buteogallus schistaceus) is a species of bird of prey in the family Accipitridae: the hawks, eagles, and allies.

It is found in northern South America: Brazil, Bolivia, Peru, Ecuador, Colombia, Venezuela, and French Guiana. Its natural habitat is subtropical or tropical swampland.

Description
It is a medium-sized to large bird, medium slate-grey in colour, with contrasting bright white horizontal banding on its tail feathers. It has a medium-white breast with vertical black markings. It has a large orange cere at the base of its beak, and large yellow eyes.

Distribution 
The slate-colored hawk inhabits parts of the Amazon basin, the Orinoco region, and French Guiana. Being a hunter of water edges for frogs, crabs, snakes, small mammals, etc., its main range is in a wide corridor along the main course of the Amazon River in the central Amazon basin. This corridor is about 700 km wide, and includes the confluence areas downstream of the major rivers: Rio Negro, Madeira, Tapajós, Xingu, and the outlet section of the Tocantins River in the southeast Basin's neighbouring river system, Araguaia-Tocantins.

The upstream range widens into the southwestern and northwestern Basin to the Andean foothills, and from the south includes northern Amazonian Bolivia, eastern Peru and Ecuador, and southeastern Amazonian Colombia. In the extreme northwest, the range narrows to include only central-northeastern Colombia, and a mid-river section of the Orinoco River drainage of central-southwestern Venezuela (the section of the Colombia-Venezuela border). The slate-colored hawk is absent from the north-central Amazon basin, and the Guiana Shield to the Guianan coast; the species does range into French Guiana in the northeast, from the Amazon River outlet north through Brazil's Amapá state, as well as Marajó Island.

References

External links

"Slate-colored hawk" videos on the Internet Bird Collection
Slate-colored Hawk photo gallery on VIREO

slate-colored hawk
Birds of the Amazon Basin
Birds of prey of South America
slate-colored hawk
Taxonomy articles created by Polbot